In the 2016–17 season, USM Alger competed in the Ligue 1 for the 39th season, as well as the Algerian Cup.  It was their 22nd consecutive season in the top flight of Algerian football. They competed in Ligue 1 as well as the CAF Champions League, and Algerian Super Cup, and the Algerian Cup.

USM Alger entered the 2016–2017 season as reigning Ligue Professionnelle 1 champions after winning the Ligue Professionnelle 1 title in the 2015–2016 season, The club was managed by Miloud Hamdi, until he left on 5 June 2016. He was replaced by Adel Amrouche on 27 June, but Amrouche resigned 3 days before the season began and was replaced by French manager Cavalli  Cavalli was later sacked because of poor results and replaced by Belgian Paul Put.

Season summary 
Red and Black will play his first friendly match against Stade brestois 29 training playing in Ligue 2, they will face the Stade Rennes team the Algerian international Players Zeffane and Bensebaini. The last game will be against CFA training of US Granville, scheduled for July 22 in Granville.

of Algerian Champion for the seventh time last season, it's a USM Alger "new look" who will defend his title. If frameworks like Khoualed, Meftah, Koudri, Zemmamouche, Benmoussa and Chafaï are still at the club, the club management decided to overhaul the team, starting with the coaching staff. Indeed, the Belgian-Algerian Adel Amrouche, former coach of Kenya, Burundi and Equatorial Guinea, replaced Hamdi.

The club recorded the arrival of several players like Amir Sayoud (DRB Tadjenanet), Raouf Benguit (Paradou AC), Ziri Hammar (JS Saoura), Mohamed Benyahia (MC Oran), Toufik Zeghdane (MC Alger), Abel Khaled and Ghislain Guessan (RC Arbaâ). This bloated recruitment is partly fill the departures of Zinedine Ferhat, best assist last season, Brahim Boudebouda, Hocine El Orfi and Mohamed Seguer, The club has also signed several players of the national selection of age 20, recently trained by Mohamed Mekhazni, back to the club. Two of these young people have made the trip to France, he is Ilyes Yaiche and Ibrahim Farhi.

First friendly match was against Stade brestois 29 and ended with a draw 1-1  goal scored by Union new player Bouderbal, three days later the team played the most important meeting against Stade Rennais from Ligue 1 and ended with the victory of the Algerian international guys Zeffane 1-0 Then, in the third meeting against the reserve team of the Stade Rennais achieved the first victory in the preparation matches by 4-0  Recording from Guessan two goals, Beldjilali goal by Penalty and finally the young Bengrina last goal, After the piece ran the team last friendly against US Granville ended with a draw 0-0 back to the team immediately after the end of the games to Algeria, Preparations were good where he discovered supporter several skilful players of the most prominent neo Bellahcene, Benyahia and Hammar in addition to the player the team youth Bengrina.

After the end of the first internship in France successfully USM Alger delegation returned to Algeria and Players he got four days rest before traveling to Tunisia, Sousse to fight a second internship between 27 July and 7 August  punctuated by three friendly matches against clubs Tunisian.

Pre-season and friendlies

Competitions

Overview

Ligue 1

League table

Results summary

Results by round

Matches

Algerian Super Cup

Algerian Cup

Champions League

First round

Group stage

Group B

Squad information

Playing statistics

Appearances (Apps.) numbers are for appearances in competitive games only including sub appearances
Red card numbers denote:   Numbers in parentheses represent red cards overturned for wrongful dismissal.

(B) – USM Alger B player

Goalscorers
Includes all competitive matches. The list is sorted alphabetically by surname when total goals are equal.

Suspensions

Clean sheets
Includes all competitive matches.

Hat-tricks

(H) – Home ; (A) – Away

Squad list
Players and squad numbers last updated on 29 July 2016.Note: Flags indicate national team as has been defined under FIFA eligibility rules. Players may hold more than one non-FIFA nationality.

Transfers

In
USM Alger started their transfer business early, acquiring midfielder Amir Sayoud for an undisclosed fee + Arslane Mazari and Djamel Chettal from DRB Tadjenanet on 9 June. USM Alger continued their recruitment in 11 June, signing young defender Raouf Benguit Loan from Paradou AC for a €50,000. 13 June, USM Alger confirmed their third summer signing in Reda Bellahcene, with the midfielder joining from FC Saint-Louis Neuweg for a free transfer. The club would later sign Ivorian prospect Ghislain Guessan, who joined the USM Alger team on a one-year deal from RC Arbaâ and also Abel Khaled from the same club. end of the season also saw the return of six players from the loan they Abderrahmane Meziane, Nazim Aklil, Abderrahmane Bourdim, Mohamed Taïb, Ibrahim Bekakchi and ivorian Manucho. in the month of July joined by four new players to the team they Rafik Bouderbal from AS Lyon-Duchère, Ziri Hammar from JS Saoura, Mohamed Benyahia from MC Oran and Toufik Zeghdane from MC Alger.

Out

New contracts

Kit
Supplier: Adidas after that Joma, the beginning of the year 2017.
Sponsor: Djezzy

Notes

References

2016-17
USM Alger